Ashman is an English surname derived from the Middle English personal name "Asheman", and also a byname form of "qescman" meaning "seaman" or "pirate", a compound of the Olde English "aesc" (boat made of) ash, plus "mann", man. It can also be a topographical name for someone who lived near a prominent ash tree. Notable people with the surname include:

Anastasia M. Ashman (born 1964), American author
George Allan Ashman (1928–2002), English footballer
Glen Ashman (born 1956), a jurist and judge from Georgia, US
Howard Ashman (1950–1991), American playwright
James Ashman (born 1848), American businessman and politician
Joe Ashman (born 1995), English actor
John Ashman (born 1926), former English cricketer
Keith M. Ashman (born 1963), British theoretical astrophysicist
Kevin Ashman (born 1959), British, World and European quiz champion and television quiz competitor
Matthew Ashman (1950–1995), English guitarist (Adam and the Ants)
Richard Ashman (1899–1965), South African cricket umpire
Rod Ashman (born 1954), retired Australian rules footballer
Ron Ashman (1926–2004), English footballer

References